Kristean Porter  (born 3 September 1971) is an American freestyle skier. She was born in Biloxi. She competed at the 1994 Winter Olympics in Lillehammer, in women's aerials. She won a gold medal in combined at the FIS Freestyle World Ski Championships 1995.

In 2020, she was inducted into the National Ski Hall of Fame.

References

External links 
 

1971 births
People from Mississippi
Living people
American female freestyle skiers
Olympic freestyle skiers of the United States
Freestyle skiers at the 1994 Winter Olympics
21st-century American women